David James Saker (born 29 May 1966 in Melbourne, Victoria) is an Australian cricket coach and former player who played first-class cricket for the Victorian Bushrangers and then the Tasmanian Tigers later on in his career.  He was the fast bowling coach for the Sri Lanka national cricket team. He has been replaced by Chaminda Vaas as the new national fast bowling coach .

Playing career
A right-arm fast-medium bowler, Saker made his first class debut in the 1994–95 season. He spent six years with the Bushrangers before accepting an offer to join the Tasmanian side at the start of the 2000–01 season. As a veteran in a fairly young side he was named as their Player of the Year for 2001–02. Saker was also a handy batsman, making four first class half-centuries, even opening the batting at times for the Bushrangers in limited-overs games. He retired in 2002–03 with 247 wickets to his name at 30.10.

Coaching
In 2004 he became an assistant coach at Victoria under Greg Shipperd.

On 8 April 2010, Saker was appointed as the fast bowling coach of the England cricket team, replacing the departing Ottis Gibson. After Saker's key role in the team winning the 2010–11 Ashes series, he was handed a new three-year contract.

Saker left the English job in early 2015, and was appointed head coach of the Melbourne Renegades in the Big Bash League. Two months later, he was also appointed coach of the Victoria Bushrangers in first class and one day cricket. He led Victoria to the Sheffield Shield in his only season with the state, and was then appointed fast-bowling coach for the Australian national cricket team in July 2016. He resigned on 7 February 2019 with immediate effect following investigations into his role in the ball tampering saga.

In July 2019, he was appointed as the fast bowling coach of the United States national cricket team on a short-term basis. In December 2019, he was appointed as the fast bowling coach of Sri Lanka national cricket team on two-year contract.

See also
 List of Victoria first-class cricketers
 List of Tasmanian representative cricketers

References

External links
 

1966 births
Living people
Victoria cricketers
Tasmania cricketers
Coaches of the England cricket team
Australian cricketers
Australian cricket coaches
Cricketers from Melbourne
Big Bash League coaches
Melbourne Renegades coaches